Brass knuckles (variously referred to as knuckles, knucks, brass knucks, knucklebusters, knuckledusters, knuckle daggers, English punch, iron fist,  paperweight, or a classic) are "fist-load weapons" used in hand-to-hand combat. Brass knuckles are pieces of metal shaped to fit around the knuckles. Despite their name, they are often made from other metals, plastics or carbon fibers. 

Designed to preserve and concentrate a punch's force by directing it toward a harder and smaller contact area, they result in increased tissue disruption, including an increased likelihood of fracturing the intended target's bones on impact. The extended and rounded palm grip also spreads the counter-force across the attacker's palm, which would otherwise have been absorbed primarily by the attacker's fingers. This reduces the likelihood of damage to the attacker's fingers. It also allows its user to break glass windows without injuring their hands, thus are widely utilized in vehicle theft to break car windows.

History and variations 

Metal ring and knuckle style weapons date back to ancient times and have been used all over the world for many hundreds of years. Vajra mushti has been practiced in India since at least the 12th century and mentioned in Manasollasa. The Nihang Sikhs used an early variant called Sher Panja in the 18th century. Cast iron, brass, lead, and wood knuckles were made in the United States during the American Civil War (1861–1865). Soldiers would often buy cast iron or brass knuckles. If they could not buy them, they would carve their own from wood, or cast them at camp by melting lead bullets and using a mold in the dirt.

Some brass knuckles have rounded rings, which increase the impact of blows from moderate to severe damage. Other instruments (not generally considered to be "brass knuckles" or "metal knuckles" per se) may have spikes, sharp points and cutting edges. These devices come in many variations and are called by a variety of names, including "knuckle knives."

By the late 19th century, knuckledusters were incorporated into various kinds of pistols such as the Apache revolver used by criminals in France in the late 19th to early 20th centuries. During World War I the US Army issued two different knuckle knives, the US model 1917 and US model 1918 Mark I trench knives. Knuckles and knuckle knives were also being made in England at the time and purchased privately by British soldiers. 

By World War II, knuckles and knuckle knives were quite popular with both American and British soldiers. The Model 1918 trench knives were reissued to American paratroopers. British Commandos even had their very own "Death's Head" knuckle knife, featuring a skull-shaped brass knuckle handle. A notable knuckle knife still in use is the Cuchillo de Paracaidista, issued to Argentinian paratroopers. Current-issue models have an emergency blade in the crossguard.

Legality and distribution 
Brass knuckles are illegal in Hong Kong, Austria, Belgium, Canada, Denmark, Bosnia, Croatia, Cyprus, Finland, Germany, Greece, Hungary, Israel, Ireland, Malaysia, the Netherlands, Norway, Poland, Portugal, Russia, Spain, Turkey, Sweden, Singapore, Taiwan, and the United Kingdom.

Import of brass knuckles into Australia is illegal unless a government permit is obtained; permits are available for only limited purposes, such as police and government use, or use in film productions. They are prohibited weapons in the state of New South Wales.

In Brazil, brass knuckles are legal and freely sold.

In Canada, brass knuckles, or any similar devices made of metal, are listed as prohibited weapons; possession of such weapon is a criminal offence under the Criminal Code. Plastic knuckles have been determined to be legal in Canada. Similar legislation has been instituted in Russia and Australia.

In France, brass knuckles are illegal. They can be bought as a "collectable" (provided one is over 18), but it is forbidden to carry or use one, whatever the circumstance, self-defense included.

In Germany, brass knuckles are by law "illegal weapons" and are forbidden for carry or possession in any known variant.

In Italy and Mexico, brass knuckles are legal and freely sold to people of legal age (over 18 years old), but carrying them is forbidden.

In Russia, brass knuckles were illegal to purchase or own during times of Russian Empire and are still forbidden according to Article 6 of 1996 Federal Law On Weapons. They are called  (from French , literally 'head breaker').

In Sweden, brass knuckles are legal to purchase and own (for people 21 years of age) but are not legal to sell in stores or carry in public. The carrying of brass knuckles carries the same penalty as carrying a knife and falls under the same law. They are called , literally "knuckle iron".

In Serbia, brass knuckles are legal to purchase and own (for people over 16 years old) but are not legal to carry in public. They are called , literally 'boxer'.

In Taiwan, according to the Law of the Republic of China, possession and sales of brass knuckles are illegal. Under the regulation, brass knuckles are considered weapons. Without the permission of the central regulatory agency, it is against the law to manufacture, sell, transport, transfer, rent, or have them in a collection or on display.

In the United States, brass knuckles are not significantly regulated at the federal level, but various state, county and city laws prohibit their purchase and/or possession. Some state laws require purchasers to be 18 or older. Most states have statutes regulating the carrying of weapons, and many specifically prohibit brass knuckles or "metal knuckles". Where they are legal, brass knuckles can normally be purchased online or at flea markets, swap meets, gun shows, and at some sword and weapon shops. Some companies manufacture belt buckles or novelty paper weights that function as brass knuckles and are sold "for entertainment purposes only". Brass knuckles made of hardened plastic, rather than metal, have been marketed as "undetectable by airport metal detectors". Several states that ban brass knuckles also ban plastic knuckles. New York's criminal law statutes list both "metal knuckles" and "plastic knuckles" as prohibited weapons but do not define either.

See also 
 Bagh nakh
 Cestus
 Mark I trench knife
 Tekko
 Vajra-mushti
 Weighted-knuckle gloves

References 

Fist-load weapons
Brass
Metallic objects